Hypsibarbus suvattii is a species of ray-finned fish in the genus Hypsibarbus which has only been recorded with certainty from the Mae Klong in Thailand.  It is a big-sized cyprinid, reaching 50 cm (19 in) SL, but it is rare species. The specific name honours Thai ichthyologist Chote Suvatti, former professor of Kasetsart University, who is one of the pioneers of fisheries in Thailand.

Footnotes 

 

Hypsibarbus
Fish described in 1996